Richard Allen Fichtner (September 16, 1939 – April 17, 2018) was an American college basketball coach.

Fichtner came from Batesville, Indiana and played four varsity sports at West Hills College Coalinga, then finished his college career playing baseball at UC Santa Barbara.

In 1964, Fichtner became an assistant basketball coach for Occidental College. He was named head coach at Occidental in 1970. He led the Tigers for three seasons, compiling a 47–31 record. Fichtner left Occidental to become an assistant coach at Division I Pacific under head coach Stan Morrison in 1973, and in 1979 became head coach when Morrison left to take the coaching job at USC. Fichtner resigned from Pacific after compiling a 36–49 record over three seasons.

Fichtner died on April 17, 2018 after a battle with bone cancer and Alzheimer's disease.

References

External links
Coaching record @ sports-reference.com

1939 births
2018 deaths
American men's basketball coaches
American men's basketball players
Basketball coaches from Indiana
College men's basketball head coaches in the United States
Junior college men's basketball players in the United States
Occidental Tigers men's basketball coaches
Pacific Tigers men's basketball coaches
UC Santa Barbara Gauchos baseball players
Deaths from bone cancer
Deaths from Alzheimer's disease